Đại Nài is a ward of the city of Ha Tinh in Ha Tinh Province, Vietnam. It has an area of 4.26 kilometers and 5,748 people as of 2004, when the quarter was established, and the population density is 1,349 per square kilometer.

References 

Populated places in Hà Tĩnh province
Communes of Hà Tĩnh province